Ramadi Barrage is a two-section diversion dam on the Euphrates River adjacent (west) of Ramadi, Iraq. The main purpose of the northern barrage is to slow or stop water if needed, allowing it to be diverted through the southern barrage into a canal. The canal feeds water into Lake Habbaniyah to the southeast.

The intent was to use water stored by the Ramadi Barrage and the Samarra Barrage for irrigation. However, evaporation on Lakes Habbaniyah and Tharthar led to reduced storage and high salinity, conditions unsuitable for irrigation.

References

Dams in Iraq
Dams on the Euphrates River
1955 establishments in Iraq
Barrages (dam)
Dams completed in 1955
Crossings of the Euphrates